Prairie City is an unincorporated community in Jackson Township, Clay County, Indiana. It is part of the Terre Haute Metropolitan Statistical Area.

History
Prairie City was founded in 1869.

Geography

References

Unincorporated communities in Clay County, Indiana
Unincorporated communities in Indiana
Terre Haute metropolitan area
1869 establishments in Indiana
Populated places established in 1869